The American Barbizon School was a group of painters and style partly influenced by the French Barbizon school, who were noted for their simple, pastoral scenes painted directly from nature.  American Barbizon artists concentrated on painting rural landscapes often including peasants or farm animals.

William Morris Hunt was the first American to work in the Barbizon style as he directly trained with Jean-François Millet in 1851–1853. When he left France, Hunt established a studio in Boston and worked in the Barbizon manner, bringing the style to the United States of America.

The Barbizon approach was generally not accepted until the 1880s and reached its pinnacle of popularity in the 1890s.

Artists 

 Maria a'Becket
 Henry Golden Dearth
 Thomas Eakins
 Winckworth Allan Gay
 Childe Hassam
 Winslow Homer
 William Morris Hunt
 Wilson Irvine
 George Inness
 William Keith
 Edward Mitchell Bannister
 Homer Dodge Martin
 Robert Crannell Minor
 John Francis Murphy
 Henry Ward Ranger
 Henry Ossawa Tanner
 Horatio Walker
 Alexis Jean Fournier
 Joseph Foxcroft Cole
 Homer Watson
 Alexander Helwig Wyant

Citations

General and cited references 
  Exhibition catalog.
  Exhibition catalog.
 

American art movements
Realism (art movement)

bg:Барбизонска школа